Bolivia elects on national level a head of state – the president –  and a legislature. The president and the vice-president are elected for a five-year term by the people. The National Congress (Congreso Nacional) has two chambers. The Chamber of Deputies (Cámara de Diputados) has 130 members, elected for a five-year term using the Additional Member System, and in the case of seven indigenous seats by usos y costumbres. The Chamber of Senators (Cámara de Senadores) has 36 members: each of the country's nine departments returns four senators allocated proportionally.

Bolivia has a multi-party system, with numerous parties. During the first 23 years of renewed democracy beginning 1982, no one party succeeded in gaining power alone, and parties had to work with each other to form coalition governments. Since 2005, a single party has achieved a parliamentary majority.

Ahead of any national election a period of prohibition takes effect. This is with the intention of preventing inebriated nationals voting in error. Nationals are also forbidden from travelling around during the same period. This is to prevent voters from voting in more than one district. On polling day it is difficult to obtain a taxi or bus, due to the limitations placed upon travel and transport.

Schedule

Election

Inauguration

Electoral system
The president is directly elected by the people, by majority. A candidate has to receive at least 50% of the vote, or 40% of the vote, and 10% more than the second candidate to be elected, otherwise a second round is held with the top two finishers to determine the winner.

The 130 members in the Chamber of Deputies (Cámara de Diputados) (excluding the seven special seats) are elected using the additional member system. 63 seats are elected in single-member districts using first-past-the-post voting. 60 additional seats are elected using closed list party-list proportional representation in districts of varying sizes corresponding to Bolivia's nine departments. For parties receiving at least 3% of the national vote, the seats are distributed using the D'Hondt method, subtracting the number of seats the respective party gained from the single-member districts in the respective department. If one party has more seats from the single-member districts alone than the proportion of list vote it received, the extra seats are taken from the last allocated list seats.

The remaining seven seats are reserved indigenous seats elected by the usos y costumbres, using first-past-the-post voting. A voter can only vote in one of either the normal constituencies or special constituencies.

The Chamber of Senators (Cámara de Senadores) has 36 members, four from each the country's nine departments, which are also elected using closed party-lists, using the D'Hondt method.

Both the senate, and the proportional part of the Chamber of Deputies is elected based on the vote for the presidential candidates, while the deputies from the single-member districts are elected using separate votes. Party lists are required to alternate between men and women, while candidates in single-member districts are required to have an alternate, of the opposite sex. At least 50% of the single-member deputies are required to be women

History of elections in Bolivia

Indirect elections, 1825-50
Elections were conducted in the early Republican period using multiple levels of electors, each of which would elect members of the next higher level, culminating in the president.

Direct elections with restricted suffrage, 1839 and 1850-1938
In the elections of 1839, however, the president was elected by a majority of all voters. This system became the norm beginning in 1850. Voting requirements included a minimum property or income or service in one of the professions, and forbid all those "in domestic service" from voting. Indigenous peoples were effectively excluded from the franchise.

Expanding electorate, 1938-1951
Under the Constitution of 1938, property restrictions on voting were removed however the vote was still restricted to those who were male, literate, and of age. Elections were held in 1940 and 1951, and saw a dramatic expansion of the electorate.

Universal suffrage and interruptions in democracy, 1952-79
General elections were held in 1956, 1960, and 1964; and purely legislative elections were held in 1958 and 1962. Democracy was interrupted in 1964 by René Barrientos Ortuño, who proceeded to hold and win an election in 1966 and to convoke the Constituent Assembly of 1966-67 to rewrite the Constitution of Bolivia. Following Barrientos' death in 1969, democracy was further interrupted by military rule until 1979, including the eight-year dictatorship of Hugo Bánzer Suarez.

Democratic transition and final dictatorship, 1979-82
In a chaotic period of transition marked by numerous coups d'état, three elections were held in 1978, 1979, 1980. Parliamentary majorities were not obtained in 1978 and 1979 and alliance building was interrupted by coups. Lydia Gueiler, an elected member of the National Congress assumed power constitutionally from November 1979 to mid-1980. The results of the 1980 elections were the basis for the post-1982 parliament and the 1982–85 government of Hernán Siles Zuazo.

Multiparty democracy, 1982-present
Elections have been held regularly in the democratic period that began in 1982. General elections were held in 1985, 1989, 1993, 1997, 2002, 2005, and 2009. A Constituent Assembly was elected in 2006. The 1985 Organic Law of Municipalities restored local elections for mayor and created a legislative body, the municipal council, in each municipality. The first local elections were held in 1987, followed by further elections in 1989, 1991, 1993, 1995, 1999, 2004, and 2010. Similarly, departmental elections for Prefect began in 2006 and elections for Departmental Legislative Assemblies began in 2010. Following the passage of the 2009 Constitution, the National Electoral Court was replaced in late 2010 by a fourth branch of government, the Plurinational Electoral Organ, whose highest body is the Supreme Electoral Court.

Latest elections

2020 Bolivian general election 

On 18 October 2020, Bolivian voters elected Luis Arce, leader of Evo Morales' MAS-IPSP, as Bolivia's president with 55% of the vote in the first round. Arce's main opponents, Carlos Mesa and Luis Fernando Camacho, received 29% and 14% of the vote, respectively. Arce took the office of president on 8 November 2020.

2017 Bolivian judicial election

2021 Bolivian regional elections

Other elections and referendum

2015 Autonomy referendum 
On September 20, 2015, five western and central departments—Cochabamba, Chuquisaca, La Paz, Oruro, and Potosí—voted on whether to approve "organic charters" (constitutions of autonomous governance), as did three municipalities and two indigenous territories. Voters in all five departments rejected their charters of autonomy, which were drafted by MAS-IPSP–led legislatures.

2011 Special municipal election

A special election is due be held for the mayor of five cities where mayors have stepped down or been indicted. In July 2011, the Supreme Electoral Tribunal formally convoked the elections for mayor in three cities: Sucre, Quillacollo, and Pazña for December 18, 2011.

See also
 Electoral calendar
 Electoral system

Notes

References

External links
Adam Carr's Election Archive